Hillary Peak is the name which has been proposed by the Government of Nepal for a  peak in the Himalayas in honour of Edmund Hillary, who made the first ascent of Everest with Tenzing Norgay in 1953.

In September 2013 a government panel recommended that two mountains be renamed Hillary Peak and Tenzing Peak as part of a batch of summits that would be opened to climbers in 2014. The coordinates given by the government indicate that it is one of a clutch of peaks on the Nepal and Tibet border between Cho Oyu and Gyachung Kang, known variously as Ngojumba Kang, Ngozumpa Kang and Ngojumba Ri.

In the fall of 2016, two time Everest summiter Elia Saikaly along with Pasang Kaji Sherpa made an expedition to Hillary Peak. They called off their summit bid due to dangers encountered including rock-falls, bad weather, hidden crevasses, and snow related issues.

See also
Hillary Step
Hillary Montes

References

Mountains of Koshi Province
Mountains of the Himalayas
Edmund Hillary